Miss Thailand Universe 2005 was the 6th Miss Thailand Universe pageant, held at Sofitel Centara Grand Bangkok, in Bangkok, Thailand on March 26, 2005. The 44 contestants arrived in Phuket to participate in activities a week earlier, then returned to Bangkok to compete in the final round, which was broadcast live on BBTV Channel 7.

Chananporn Rosjan was crowned Miss Thailand Universe 2005 by Morakot Aimee Kittisara, Miss Thailand Universe 2004.  Rosjan subsequently represented Thailand in Miss Universe 2005 pageant in Bangkok, Thailand. She is the first Miss Thailand Universe to win the Best National Costume award.

Runner-up Nusara Suknamai was one of five passengers (including the pilot) traveling in a helicopter belonging to Leicester City Football Club owner Vichai Srivaddhanaprabha, also on board, which crashed on the evening of 27 October 2018, with no survivors.

Results
Color keys

The winner and two runner-up were awarded to participate internationally (two title from the Big Four international beauty pageants and two minor international beauty pageants) positions were given in the following order:

Placements

Special awards

Delegates

References

External links 
 Miss Thailand Universe official website

2005
2005 in Bangkok
2005 beauty pageants
March 2005 events in Thailand
Beauty pageants in Thailand